AEDIPS, the Association of Educational Development and Improvement Professionals in Scotland is an association that supports the development of education in Scotland, with a particular focus on entitlement and quality.

Formerly known as the AEAS (the Association of Educational Advisers in Scotland), AEDIPS updated its constitution and its name in 2005 to reflect the changing roles of professionals working in the areas of quality improvement, curriculum, and professional development in Scottish education today.

AEDIPS acts as a forum for the approximate five hundred educational professionals now supporting schools in all sectors of education in the areas of improvement, curriculum, and professional development in local authorities in Scotland.

Membership of AEDIPS is open to permanent staff, secondees, consultants, and former improvement and  development professionals who may have moved on from local authority work but wish to keep up with educational developments in Scotland.

External links
AEDIPS website

Educational administration
Educational organisations based in Scotland